Smoke City was an English band that blended acid jazz and trip hop, borrowing from Brazilian styles such as samba and bossa nova and some lyrics have excerpts in Portuguese. They are best known for their single "Underwater Love", which was a major hit in 1997, after being used in a Levi's television advertisement, "Mermaids" (directed by Michel Gondry). In 1997, the band released their first album, Flying Away, which included several hits such as "Underwater Love", "Mr. Gorgeous (and Miss Curvaceous)" and "Águas de Março (Joga Bossa Mix)". Smoke City's next album, Heroes of Nature, was released in 2001. An extended version of Heroes of Nature had three more tracks than the original, one of them being a cover version of John Lennon's "Imagine".

"Underwater Love" is also a track on the soundtrack for Thicker Than Water, a surf video.

In 1998, the band contributed "O Cara Lindo (Mr. Gorgeous)" to the AIDS benefit compilation album Onda Sonora: Red Hot + Lisbon, which was produced by the Red Hot Organization.

The group disbanded in 2002.

Slant Magazine listed their album Flying Away #20 on their list of greatest trip-hop albums of all time.

Members 
 Nina Miranda (vocals, fx)
 Mark Brown (programming, turntables, keyboards, percussion, vocals, fx)
 Chris Franck (guitar, keyboards, percussion, bass, vocals)

Discography

Studio albums 
 Flying Away (1997)
 Heroes of Nature (2001)

Live albums 
 Black Sessions - Smoke City

Singles 
 "Underwater Love" (1997) - UK No. 4, AUS No. 41, AUT No. 23, BE-FL No. 42, BE-WA No. 33, GER No. 55, NLD No. 97, NOR No. 18, SWE No. 58, SWI No. 32
 "Mr. Gorgeous (and Miss Curvaceous)" (1997) Italy No. 1
 "Águas de Março" (1998)
 "With You" (1998)

References

External links 
 Concert photos by Laurent Orseau (Black Session)

Trip hop groups
English electronic music groups
Musical groups established in 1996
Musical groups disestablished in 2002
British musical trios
Acid jazz ensembles